Low-flying aircraft may mean:
Low flying military training
Aircraft flying near an airport:
Takeoff
Landing
Aircraft flying below the allowed minimum height for the type within an aviation authority's jurisdiction, such as
Hang-gliders
Microlights
Drone (aircraft)
Balloon (aeronautics)
Search and rescue aircraft

In the arts
Low-Flying Aircraft and Other Stories, a book by J. G Ballard
Low-Flying Aircraft (film), a Portuguese film originally titled Aparelho Voador a Baixa Altitude

See also
Ceiling (aircraft)